Facundo Silvera Paz (born 20 January 1997) is a Uruguayan footballer who plays as a defender.

Career

River Plate
A graduate of the club's youth academy, Silvera made his debut for the club on 28 May 2017, coming on as an 86th-minute substitute for Gonzalo Vega Martínez in a 2-1 defeat to Nacional. Nearly two years later, he scored his first goal for the club, scoring late in a 4-1 victory over Racing Club. Prior to the 2021 season, Silvera was released by the club.

Career statistics

Club

References

External links

1997 births
Living people
Club Atlético River Plate (Montevideo) players
Uruguayan Primera División players
Uruguayan footballers
Association football defenders